Katrin Meissner (born 17 January 1973) is a former freestyle swimmer from East Germany, who won three medals at the 1988 Summer Olympics in Seoul, South Korea. The fifteen-year-old triumphed with the GDR women's relay team in the 4×100 m medley and in the 4×100 m freestyle, and finished third in the 50 m freestyle.

See also
 List of German records in swimming

External links
 
 Katrin Meissner at databaseOlympics
 
 

1973 births
Living people
People from East Berlin
Swimmers from Berlin
German female freestyle swimmers
Olympic swimmers of East Germany
Olympic swimmers of Germany
Swimmers at the 1988 Summer Olympics
Swimmers at the 2000 Summer Olympics
Olympic gold medalists for East Germany
Olympic bronze medalists for East Germany
Medalists at the 1988 Summer Olympics
World record setters in swimming
Olympic bronze medalists in swimming
World Aquatics Championships medalists in swimming
Medalists at the FINA World Swimming Championships (25 m)
European Aquatics Championships medalists in swimming
Olympic gold medalists in swimming
Recipients of the Patriotic Order of Merit in gold
20th-century German women